The 2009–10 season was Ergotelis' 80th season in existence, 5th season in the Super League Greece, and the fourth consecutive since the club's latest promotion from the Football League. Ergotelis also participated in the Greek cup, entering the competition in the Fourth Round. The club ultimately managed to finish in 11th place, despite a notable fifth-place position at the end of the championship First Round. During this season the club celebrated its 80th anniversary, culminating relevant festivities in style, by thrashing Super League champions Olympiacos in a memorable friendly match with a 5–0 victory.

Players

The following players have departed in mid-season

Out of team 

Note: Flags indicate national team as has been defined under FIFA eligibility rules. Players and Managers may hold more than one non-FIFA nationality.

Transfers

In

Promoted from youth system

Total spending:  500.000 €

Out 
 
Total income:  1.800.000 €

Expenditure:  1.300.000 €

Pre-season and friendlies

Pre-season friendlies

Mid-season friendlies

Post-season friendlies

Competitions

Overview 

Last updated: 5 August 2014

Super League Greece

League table

Results summary

Matches

Greek Cup

Fourth round

Matches

Statistics

Goal scorers

Last updated: 20 August 2014

References

Ergotelis
Ergotelis F.C. seasons